Eliza Poe ( Elizabeth Arnold; formerly Hopkins; 1787 – December 8, 1811) was an English actress and the mother of the American author Edgar Allan Poe.

Life and career
Elizabeth Arnold was born to Henry and Elizabeth Arnold in London in the spring of 1787. Her mother was a stage actress in London from 1791 to 1795. Henry is thought to have died in 1790 and, in November 1795, only mother and daughter sailed from England to the United States, arriving in Boston, Massachusetts, on January 3, 1796.

Arnold debuted on the Boston stage at the age of nine, only three months after her arrival in the United States. She played a character named Biddy Blair in David Garrick's farce Miss in Her Teens and was praised in the Portland Herald: "Miss Arnold, in Miss Biddy, exceeded all praise.. Although a miss of only nine years old, her powers as an Actress will do credit to any of her sex of maturer age". Later that year, Elizabeth married musician Charles Tubbs, who had sailed with the Arnolds from England. The small family joined with a manager Mr. Edgar to form a theater troupe called the Charleston Comedians. Elizabeth, Eliza's mother, died sometime while this troupe was traveling through North Carolina. Little is known about her death but she disappears from theatrical records in 1798 and it is presumed she died shortly after.

After her mother's death, Eliza stayed with the theater troupe. She followed the tradition at the time for actors to travel from city to city to perform for as long as several months before moving on. The actors, theaters, and audiences had a wide range of sophistication. One of the most impressive venues at which she performed was the Chestnut Street Theater near Independence Hall in Philadelphia, Pennsylvania, which seated two thousand. Over the course of her career she played some 300 parts, as well as choral and dancing roles, including William Shakespeare characters Juliet Capulet and Ophelia.

In the summer of 1802, at the age of fifteen, Eliza married Charles Hopkins. Hopkins died three years later in October 1805, possibly of yellow fever, leaving Eliza an eighteen-year-old widow. The Baltimore-born David Poe Jr. saw Eliza performing in Norfolk, Virginia, and decided to join her acting troupe, abandoning his family's plans for him to study law. Poe married Eliza only six months after Hopkins's death in 1806.

The couple traveled throughout New England and the rest of the northeast, playing in various towns such as Richmond, Philadelphia, and at an outdoor summer theater in New York City before finally settling in Boston. They stayed in Boston for three consecutive seasons of thirty weeks each in a theater that fit an audience of about one thousand. Reviews at the time often remarked on Eliza's "interesting figure" and "sweetly melodious voice". Though times were difficult, the couple had two sons; William Henry Leonard was born in January 1807 (nine months after their wedding) and Edgar was born on January 19, 1809, at a boarding-house near Boston Common, close to where their troupe was performing. Eliza performed until 10 days before Edgar's birth and may have named her second son after the Mr. Edgar who led the Charleston Comedians.

The family relocated to New York City in the summer of 1809. Eliza had often been praised for her acting ability while David's performances were routinely criticized harshly, possibly due to his own stage fright. David, an ill-tempered alcoholic, abandoned the stage and his family about six weeks after moving to New York. Though David's fate is unknown, there is some evidence to suggest he died in Norfolk on December 11, 1811. In his absence, Eliza gave birth to a third child, a daughter she called Rosalie, in December 1810. Rosalie was later described as "backward" and she may have been intellectually disabled. Eliza continued traveling as she performed.

Death

In 1811, while staying at a boarding house in Richmond, Virginia, for a performance, Eliza began spitting blood. Her performances became less frequent until October 1811 when she stopped appearing altogether. Her last performance was on October 11, 1811, as Countess Wintersen in a play called The Stranger.

Friends and fellow actors Mr. and Mrs. Luke Usher (the name may have inspired Poe's tale "The Fall of the House of Usher") took care of the children during Eliza's illness and many in the Richmond area took an interest in her health. On November 29 of that year, the Richmond Theater announced a benefit performance on her behalf. A local publication, the Enquirer, reported her need for help: "On this night, Mrs. Poe, lingering on the bed of disease and surrounded by her children, asks your assistance and asks it perhaps for the last time".

Eliza finally died on Sunday morning, December 8, 1811, at the age of twenty-four, surrounded by her children. It is generally assumed that she died of tuberculosis. She is buried at St. John's Episcopal Church in Richmond. Though her actual burying place is unknown, a memorial marks the general area.

After her death, her three children were split up. William Henry Leonard Poe lived with his paternal grandparents in Baltimore, Edgar Poe was taken in by John and Frances Allan in Richmond, and Rosalie Poe was adopted by William and Jane Scott Mackenzie in Richmond, Virginia.

Influence
Though he was young when she died, Edgar Poe was heavily affected by Eliza Poe's death and many of his works reflect her influence. His first published work "Metzengerstein" features a fire burning down a large home, possibly reflecting the fire that destroyed the Richmond Theatre, where she had performed. The fire occurred in December 1811, only three weeks after her death. The early loss of his mother and other women, including his wife Virginia, may also have inspired Edgar Poe's often-used literary theme of dying women. This theme is readily present in works like "The Raven".

Notes

Sources
Meyers, Jeffrey. Edgar Allan Poe: His Life and Legacy. New York City: Cooper Square Press, 1992. .
Silverman, Kenneth. Edgar A. Poe: Mournful and Never-ending Remembrance. New York City: Harper Perennial, 1991. .
Sova, Dawn B. Edgar Allan Poe: A to Z. New York: Checkmark Books, 2001. .
Stashower, Daniel. The Beautiful Cigar Girl: Mary Rogers, Edgar Allan Poe, and the Invention of Murder. New York: Dutton, 2006. .

Further reading
Smith, Geddeth. The Brief Career of Eliza Poe. Fairleigh Dickinson University Press: April 1988.

External links

 "Market Lass: The Myriad Roles of Elizabeth Poe" by Maggi Smith-Dalton at Boston Singers Resource
 Eliza Poe at Poedecoder.com
 

1787 births
1811 deaths
English emigrants to the United States
19th-century deaths from tuberculosis
Poe family (United States)
English stage actresses
Actresses from London
Tuberculosis deaths in Virginia
19th-century American actresses
American stage actresses